USS Brambling is a name used more than once by the U.S. Navy:

 , a coastal minesweeper commissioned on 15 October 1941.
 , commissioned on 23 September 1942.

References 
 

United States Navy ship names